Edur is a surname. Notable people with the surname include:

Mark Edur (born 1998), Estonian footballer
Thomas Edur (born 1969), Estonian ballet dancer
Tom Edur (born 1954), Estonian-Canadian ice hockey player

See also
Eder (surname)